Sukhanovsky is a rural locality (a khutor) in Kachalinskoye Rural Settlement, Surovikinsky District, Volgograd Oblast, Russia. The population was 155 as of 2010. There are 5 streets.

Geography 
Sukhanovsky is located near the Liska River, 24 km east of Surovikino (the district's administrative centre) by road. Blizhneosinovsky is the nearest rural locality.

References 

Rural localities in Surovikinsky District